Ludanice is a municipality in the Topoľčany District of the Nitra Region, Slovakia.

Demographics 
In  2011 it had 1839 inhabitants.

Features 
The most important sightseeing is a church from 1701. The village is quite developed as most of the villages in Topoľčany district.

References

External links
http://en.e-obce.sk/obec/ludanice/ludanice.html
Official homepage

Villages and municipalities in Topoľčany District